The 35th Ryder Cup Matches were held September 17–19, 2004, in the United States at the South Course of Oakland Hills Country Club in Bloomfield Township, Michigan, a suburb northwest of Detroit.

The European team won the competition by a margin of 18 to 9 points, The victory margin was the largest by a European team in the history of the event, and the largest by either side since 1981, when Team USA defeated Team Europe by the same score. It was also the largest margin of defeat for the USA since the competition started in 1927.

Television
In the United States, live Friday coverage was provided by USA Network.  Bill Macatee and Peter Kostis hosted from the 18th tower. NBC Sports presented live coverage of the Saturday and Sunday matches. Dan Hicks and Johnny Miller hosted from the 18th tower, Bob Murphy called holes, while on-course reporters were Gary Koch, Mark Rolfing, Roger Maltbie, and Ed Sneed.

Format
The Ryder Cup is a match play event, with each match worth one point. The competition format changed slightly from used from that used from 1991 to 2002, with the order of play swapped on the second day:
Day 1 (Friday) — 4 fourball (better ball) matches in a morning session and 4 foursome (alternate shot) matches in an afternoon session
Day 2 (Saturday) — 4 fourball matches in a morning session and 4 foursome matches in an afternoon session
Day 3 (Sunday) — 12 singles matches
With a total of 28 points, 14 points were required to win the Cup, and 14 points were required for the defending champion to retain the Cup. All matches were played to a maximum of 18 holes.

Teams 

Captains picks are shown in yellow; the world rankings and records are at the start of the 2004 Ryder Cup.

As vice-captains, United States captain Hal Sutton selected Jack Burke and Steve Jones, to assist him during the tournament.

Captains picks are shown in yellow; the world rankings and records are at the start of the 2004 Ryder Cup.

As vice-captains, European captain Bernhard Langer selected Joakim Haeggman and Anders Forsbrand to assist him during the tournament.

Thursday practice

Friday's matches

Morning four-ball
U.S. captain Hal Sutton put his top pairing of Tiger Woods and Phil Mickelson in the first match of the Ryder Cup, hoping to come out to a quick lead. The decision backfired on Sutton, as the Woods/Mickelson pairing fell behind almost from the start, eventually losing. Only a 7-foot par putt by Chris Riley on the 18th hole of his match kept Team USA from being shut out by Team Europe. Team USA never had the lead during any of the first day's four-ball matches.

Afternoon foursomes
The afternoon alternate-shot session was almost as good for Team Europe as the morning session. Mickelson and Woods lost an early lead in their match, leaving Woods winless in the first day of his last three Ryder Cups. Team USA picked up its first full point, but Europe ended the day with a 6–1 lead, its largest lead after the first day in Ryder Cup history.

Saturday's matches

Morning four-ball

Afternoon foursomes

Sunday's singles matches

Individual player records
Each entry refers to the win–loss–half record of the player.

Source:

United States

Europe

References

Ryder Cup
Golf in Michigan
Bloomfield Hills, Michigan
Ryder Cup
Ryder Cup
Ryder Cup
Ryder Cup